The flyweight was the lightest boxing weight class held as part of the Boxing at the 1904 Summer Olympics programme. The competition was held on September 22, 1904. It was the first time the event, like all other boxing events, was held in Olympic competition.

Results

Sources

References

Flyweight